Eremias aria is a species of lizard found in Afghanistan.

References

Eremias
Reptiles described in 1967
Taxa named by Steven C. Anderson
Taxa named by Alan E. Leviton